The Clark Hills are a cluster of low, mainly snow-covered hills of about  extent, located  southwest of the Eland Mountains in Palmer Land. They were mapped by the United States Geological Survey in 1974, and named by the Advisory Committee on Antarctic Names for Kerry B. Clark, United States Antarctic Research Program biologist on the International Weddell Sea Oceanographic Expeditions in 1968 and 1969.

References 

Hills of Palmer Land